Achaeta may refer to:
 Achaeta (annelid), genus of annelids
 Achaeta, genus of plants, synonym of Koeleria

See also
 Acheta, genus of crickets